Happy Hollidays is a Scottish television situation comedy, created and written by Simon Carlyle and Gregor Sharp, and broadcast by BBC Scotland. One series of the comedy was commissioned by BBC Scotland and the show was produced by Effingee Productions.

The series stars Ford Kiernan as Colin Holliday, who is the owner of the titular Happy Hollidays, a fictitious caravan site in Scotland; Karen Dunbar as cabaret singer Joyce Mullen; and Gavin Mitchell as rival caravan site owner Mike Bryan. The supporting cast portray the various members of staff on the two caravan sites and the guests. The series follows Colin Holliday running the caravan site, dealing with his guests, whom he sees as a source of revenue and little else, and trying to outwit Mike Bryan, his arch-enemy.

Cast
  Ford Kiernan as Colin Holliday
  Karen Dunbar as Joyce Mullen
  Gavin Mitchell as Mike Bryan
  Anthony Bowers as Dean Bullock
  Kathleen McDermott as Debbi

Episodes

References

External links

BBC television sitcoms
BBC Scotland television shows
Scottish television sitcoms
2009 Scottish television series debuts
2000s Scottish television series
2009 Scottish television series endings
2000s British sitcoms